The Stewart B. McKinney National Wildlife Refuge is a  National Wildlife Refuge in ten units across the U.S. state of Connecticut. Located in the Atlantic Flyway, the refuge spans  of Connecticut coastline and provides important resting, feeding, and nesting habitat for many species of wading birds, shorebirds, songbirds and terns, including the endangered roseate tern. Adjacent waters serve as wintering habitat for brant, scoters, American black duck, and other waterfowl.

Originally named the Salt Meadow National Wildlife Refuge, the refuge was renamed in 1987 after Stewart B. McKinney, a congressman from Connecticut.

Units, wildlife, and facilities
The refuge consists of ten separate land units.  From east to west they are:

 Salt Meadow Unit: Oldest unit of the refuge, the Salt Meadow unit is the location of the refuge headquarters in Westbrook, Connecticut. Salt Meadow is used by over 280 species of migrating neotropical birds during the spring and fall migrations. Thus, this unit has been designated an "Important Bird Area" by the National Audubon Society. The  of trails at Salt Meadow  wind through grassland, forest, and marsh habitats. The  of fields support woodcock, bluebirds, tree swallows, wild turkeys and numerous species of butterflies and dragonflies. Birdwatchers can expect to see great egrets, glossy ibis, snowy egrets, belted kingfishers, osprey, red tailed hawk, and many other species. Mammal species include red fox, white-tailed deer, skunk, and coyote. In partnership with Potopaug Audubon Society, the refuge hosts many wildlife events at Salt Meadow Unit throughout the year. These events have included owl walks, waterfowl walks, woodcock walks, bird banding demonstrations, and a presentation on live birds of prey.
 Falkner Island Unit: Falkner Island is located three miles (5 km) off the shore of Guilford, Connecticut. It must be accessed by private vessel and is closed to public visitation except during the open house. Falkner Island Unit is home to over 124 pairs of nesting roseate terns (a federally listed endangered species) and over 3000 nesting pairs of common terns. Thus, this unit has been designated an "Important Bird Area" by the National Audubon Society. The Falkner Island unit is closed to public visitation throughout the year due to the fragile status of the roseate terns that nest there. However, the refuge does open the island for a two-day open house each September. During the open house, visitors have an opportunity to visit an actual research camp and an historic lighthouse that was originally commissioned in 1802. The lighthouse, research facility, and the natural beauty of the island allow for many photographic opportunities.  This unit is at 
 Outer Island Unit: This unit is located on Outer Island in the Thimble Island Chain off the coast of Branford, Connecticut. It must be accessed by ferry from Stony Creek, Connecticut, or by private vessel. The pink granite which dominates the geology of Outer Island provides spectacular photography opportunities.
 Milford Point Unit: This unit is located near Milford, Connecticut, and features an observation deck along the boardwalk. The overlook at Milford Point allows visitors the opportunity to view the  barrier beach. Shorebirds such as sandpipers, oystercatchers, least terns and even the federally threatened piping plover may be seen from the platform. To decrease disturbance to this fragile area, wildlife viewing must be accomplished from the observation deck or the very tip of the peninsula. Fishermen and visitors may walk to the tip of the peninsula by way of a marked fishing access trail, but are discouraged from stopping along the way.
 Great Meadows Unit: This unit is located in Stratford, Connecticut. There are no nature trails at this time, however from the surrounding roadways, there are opportunities to see northern harriers, red-breasted mergansers, American black ducks, pied billed grebe, great blue herons, and numerous other bird species.
A ferry to Sheffield Island leaves from Hope Dock, located near the Maritime Aquarium in South Norwalk. A private vessel must be used to reach Chimon Island Unit. The Goose Island and Peach Island units are closed to public visits. The trail at Sheffield Island allows visitors to view a tidal salt water pond which is utilized by egrets and belted kingfishers. The island is also heavily used by white-tailed deer. Adjacent to the refuge on Sheffield Island, the Norwalk Seaport Association maintains an historic stone lighthouse and keepers quarters. Tours are given of the lighthouse by the Norwalk Seaport Association for a nominal charge. These units are at: Chimon , Sheffield , Goose , and Peach .

Topography
The ten units of Stewart B. McKinney NWR include a variety of habitats from grassy upland, to tidal salt marsh. Native wildlife populations have diverse habitat requirements. Each species, from roseate terns to American black ducks, has very different needs for food, water, shelter and space. The refuge units along Connecticut's coast fill these needs by providing habitats that are forested, marshy, sandy and secluded island habitats.

History

Salt Meadow was the country house of Elizabeth Fisher Read and Esther Lape. This donation became Salt Meadow National Wildlife Refuge. As neighbors donated or sold adjacent property to the US Fish and Wildlife Service, Salt Meadow grew to be a  refuge.

As the state became more and more populated, coastal areas and islands were being developed at an alarming rate. Citizens began to worry that the long legged wading birds and other shorebirds that use Connecticut's Islands and Coast would soon be without important nesting and feeding habitat. With the help of non-profit groups like The Connecticut Audubon Society, The Nature Conservancy, Trust for Public Land, and the Westbrook Land Trust, Sheffield, Chimon, and Goose Islands near Norwalk and Milford Point in Milford were acquired by the U.S. Fish and Wildlife Service.

In 1984, these Islands were added to Salt Meadow National Wildlife Refuge and the name was changed to Connecticut's Coastal National Wildlife Refuge. In 1987, the name of the refuge was again changed to honor US Congressman Stewart B. McKinney, who had an integral role in the refuge's formation.

In 2003, Calf Island in the town of Greenwich was added to the refuge.  In 2005, Peach Island was added to the refuge.  Through generous donations and the help of many partners the refuge now consists of ten refuge units spread across  of Connecticut's coastline, from Westbrook to Greenwich.

News
In 2007 and 2008 the town of Stratford debated whether the town would sell town owned lands to the U.S. Fish and Wildlife Service.  If the property is sold, it would presumably be made part of the McKinney Refuge.  From the Connecticut Post:

Comprehensive Conservation Planning Process
The U.S. Fish and Wildlife Service is required by the National Wildlife System Refuge Improvement Act of 1997 to create 15-year comprehensive conservation plans (CCPs) for each of its refuges.  A CCP,

The planning process for Stewart B. McKinney National Wildlife Refuge was begun in the spring of 2011.  Public input is solicited by the Service via public meetings, email, and postal mail.  Public scoping meetings were held in June, 2011 at the refuge headquarters in Westbrook, CT and at the Raymond Baldwin Center in Stratford, CT.  The public comment period for the scoping phase of the project is open until July 20, 2011. There will be additional opportunities to comment on a draft plan which is expected to be available in March, 2012.

See also
 List of National Wildlife Refuges
 Pleasure Beach, an area in Bridgeport, Connecticut, adjacent to the "Long Beach West" area in Stratford that is being considered for sale to the U.S. Fish and Wildlife Service.

References

External links
 Stewart B. McKinney National Wildlife Refuge
 Stewart B. McKinney National Wildlife Refuge Comprehensive Conservation Planning (CCP)
 U.S. Fish and Wildlife Service profile of Stewart B. McKinney National Wildlife Refuge
 
 
 Pleasure Beach Photos
 CT DEP/UConn Coastal Access Guide: Long Beach, Stratford, CT

National Wildlife Refuges in Connecticut
Long Island Sound
Tourist attractions in Fairfield County, Connecticut
Tourist attractions in New Haven County, Connecticut
Tourist attractions in Middlesex County, Connecticut
Protected areas of Middlesex County, Connecticut
Protected areas of Fairfield County, Connecticut
Protected areas of New Haven County, Connecticut
Protected areas established in 1972
Wetlands of Connecticut
Landforms of Middlesex County, Connecticut
Landforms of Fairfield County, Connecticut
Landforms of New Haven County, Connecticut